Belmont Hill School is an independent boys school on a  campus in Belmont, a suburb of Boston, Massachusetts. The school enrolls approximately 440 students in grades 7-12, separated into the Middle School (grades 7-9) and the Upper School (grades 10-12), and refers to these grades as "Forms" with a Roman Numeral I through VI. While the majority of attending students are day students, there are some who enroll in the school's five-day boarding program, which becomes an option for students in their 9th grade year.

History

The school was founded in 1923 by a group of seven incorporators seeking a non-boarding institution for their sons that would allow for small classes and personal accountability. At the time of its incorporation, the location atop Belmont Hill was not yet developed and belonged to the Belmont Hill Trust. With the help of Robert Atkins, an incorporator and member of the Trust,  of undeveloped, rough, and swampy land was purchased in March 1923 and Belmont Hill’s first Headmaster, Reginald Heber Howe, was appointed.

Howe, a member of the faculty at the Middlesex School for 20 years, raised money for the necessary facilities. By the fall, renovations to the Headmaster’s house had taken place, along with the construction of an athletic field, a dormitory, and a single academic building, later named the Howe Building. The school finally opened its doors in the fall of 1923 to 43 boys (grades 3-9) and four faculty.

Munro Leaf, author of the children's book The Story of Ferdinand, served on Belmont Hill's faculty as an English teacher beginning in 1929.

Athletics

Belmont Hill's athletics program offers 16 interscholastic sports, 57 teams, and over 700 athletic contests each year. Almost all Belmont Hill coaches are members of the teaching faculty. Belmont Hill competes in the Independent School League.

Belmont Hill constructed its Jordan Athletic Center in the year 2000 and later installed two new turf fields used for football, lacrosse, and soccer. "The JAC" also contains two basketball courts, a wrestling room, seven squash courts, a free weights and workout facility, and an Olympic-size hockey rink that is converted into four full tennis courts during the non-winter months. Sports offered for middle school and upper school students at Belmont Hill include:

Fall
 Football (5 teams) - 4 New England Championships, Eight ISL Titles
 Soccer (7 teams) 
 Cross Country (3 teams) - ISL Title 2010, 2016

Winter
 Hockey (5 teams) - 2 New England Championships, 30 ISL Championships, 18 Lawrenceville Tournament Championships, 10 Nichols-Belmont Hill Championships  
 Basketball (5 teams) 
 Wrestling (2 teams) - Won ISL Dual Meets 16 times, New England Champions 2007, 2009, 2016, 2018, 2019, 2020
 Squash (3 teams) (not including a middle school and upper school intramural team) - 19 time ISL Champions
 Alpine Skiing (2 teams) - 2 NEPSAC Titles, 17 ISL Titles 
 Nordic (Cross Country) Skiing (1 Team)  - Lakes Region Championship Winners 2019, 2020

Spring
 Baseball (5 teams) - 16 ISL League Titles, Past 10 Seasons; 1st or 2nd Place, Only team to win ISL and League Sportsmanship Award in the same year.
 Lacrosse (5 teams) ISL Champions 2015, 2016, 2017, 2020 
 Crew (2 teams)  New England Champions 2003-2010, 2012-2014, 2016, 2019
 Track (3 teams) ISL and New England Champions 2017
 Tennis (3 teams) - 17 ISL titles 
 Golf (1 Team) - Won ISL league 15 times since 1989 
 Sailing (1 Team)

Visual and performing arts 

Belmont Hill offers both curricular and extracurricular tuition in visual arts, music and theater. Students engage in class-related and independent projects in drawing, painting, woodworking, digital photography, ceramics, mechanical drawing (architecture) print development, music composition, and theatre productions. Student work is displayed throughout the year in the school's Landau Gallery alongside independent professional artists.

The music program at Belmont Hill is carried out in the school's Prenatt Music Center. Students may join a number of performance groups including Jazz Ensemble, Rock Ensemble, Orchestra, Glee Club, and the B-Flats (an acapella group). The school has close ties with the Berklee College of Music in Boston, allowing the boys to take individual lessons on campus during the week. Serious musicians often enroll in the program’s advanced courses.

Theater productions are held regularly in the school's small Kraft Theatre. Belmont Hill puts on a total of seven productions over the course of the school year including three middle school productions, three upper school productions, and a senior-directed production each spring. These performances are put on in collaboration with the Winsor School and/or Dana Hall School, two of Belmont Hill's sister schools. Performances during the 2009-10 school year included The Bridge to Terabithia, The Curious Savage, The Foreigner, The Music Man, and Rent.

Extracurricular activities

Students' schedules include a variety of different extracurricular activities. These are broken up into Middle School and Upper School organizations, with leadership positions filled by middle or upper school students accordingly.

Belmont Hill has student-run organizations including a student senate, debate team, school newspaper (The Hill for the Middle School, The Panel for the Upper School), yearbook (The Sundial), and social sciences magazine (The Podium). Every other edition of The Panel is produced together with students from the Winsor School. The Belmont Hill Junto, modeled on Benjamin Franklin's original club, is a collection of students who meet weekly for the purpose of mutual improvement. New student clubs and organizations are founded every semester based on interest level.

Over 70% of the student body participates in voluntary clubs and service trips for community service. Groups include SAFE (Students Actively Fostering Equality), Peer Leaders, Sustainability, Meadowbrook Retirement Home, and Investment Group. An extension of the community service program includes an annual week-long spring break trip to different regions throughout the United States. Groups have travelled to California, Alabama, and Florida participating in several service projects.

Global education

Belmont Hill has various programs to study and travel abroad. Typically, students who choose to do so will spend a semester or the entire year during their Junior (Form V) year in these programs which range from:

 HMI Semester - Colorado
 Alzar School - Idaho/Chile
 Mountain School - Vermont
 Island School - Bahamas
 SYA China
 SYA Spain
 SYA France
 SYA Italy

Enrollment and admission

The application process begins early in the fall, a full year prior to the intended fall of enrollment. Belmont Hill enrolls approximately 50 new students in the 7th grade (Form I) every year, 10-12 in the 8th grade (Form II), and 15-25 in the 9th grade (Form III). On occasion, a few boys may join the school in the 10th or 11th grade as well. Graduating classes tend to fluctuate from 80-90 boys, depending on the year, however the school functions with an enrollment of approximately 445 students.

Notable alumni

Literature 
John Authers, financial journalist and writer, 1985
Gotham Chopra, author, filmmaker, and entrepreneur
Robin Moore, author of The French Connection
Thomas Winship, former Boston Globe editor

Athletics 
Connor Brickley, former NHL player
Jay Civetti, Tufts University football coach
Bill Cleary, former Harvard University Athletic Director and Olympic Men's Ice Hockey gold medalist 
Bob Cleary, Olympic Men's Ice Hockey gold medalist
Mike Condon, former NHL Goalie for the Ottawa Senators
Michael di Santo, 2016 Olympian in the US Men's Eight
Mark Fusco, former NHL player and NCAA Hockey Hobey Baker Award winner
Scott Fusco, NCAA Hockey Hobey Baker Award winner
Matt Grzelcyk, current NHL defenseman for the Boston Bruins
Toby Kimball, former NBA player
Jonathan Kraft, President of the New England Patriots
Paul Mara, former NHL player
Ian Moran, former NHL player
Ted Murphy, 2000 Olympic silver medalist in Men's Rowing
Christian Ruuttu, former NHL Player
Jimmy Vesey, NCAA Hockey Hobey Baker Award winner, current NHL player for the New York Rangers
Ben Wanger, American-Israeli baseball pitcher, Tokyo 2020 Team Israel Olympian
Richard Jarvis, former NFL football player with the Atlanta Falcons
Chris Kelleher, former NHL defenseman for the Boston Bruins
David Jensen, former Olympian and NHL player with the Hartford Whalers and Washington Capitals
C.J. Young, former NHL winger with the Boston Bruins and Calgary Flames
Field Yates, sports broadcaster, writer

Government 
Kingman Brewster, former president of Yale University, United States Ambassador to the United Kingdom
Rachel Levine, Assistant Secretary of Health under President Joe Biden
Mark A. Milley, 20th Chairman of the Joint Chiefs of Staff

Academic 
 C. Loring Brace IV, biological anthropologist and Professor at the University of Michigan
 Edmund S. Morgan, historian and Emeritus Professor at Yale University

Other 
Robert Carlock, writer and producer for 30 Rock, co-creator and showrunner of Unbreakable Kimmy Schmidt
Mortimer J. Buckley, president and director, The Vanguard Group
David E. Kelley, television producer (L.A. Law, Ally McBeal), husband of Michelle Pfeiffer
Thomas H. Lee, founder of Thomas H. Lee Partners private equity firm
Tony Maws, Boston chef

References

External links

Belmont Hill School Official Website
The Panel Online
 
 Belmont Hill School on Instagram. Archived from the original on ghostarchive.org

Private high schools in Massachusetts
Independent School League
Boys' schools in Massachusetts
Belmont, Massachusetts
Schools in Middlesex County, Massachusetts
Private middle schools in Massachusetts